Alhambra High School may refer to:
Alhambra High School (Alhambra, California), Alhambra, California
Alhambra High School (Martinez, California), Martinez, California
Alhambra High School (Arizona), Phoenix, Arizona